State Route 6 (SR 6) is a primary state highway in the U.S. state of Virginia.  Known for most of its length as River Road, the state highway runs  from U.S. Route 250 (US 250) in Afton east to SR 161 in Richmond.  SR 6 is one of the main highways of mountainous Nelson County, where the highway runs north–south from its beginning to US 29.  From Scottsville to Richmond, the state highway parallels the James River.  SR 6 is a major suburban highway through southwestern Henrico County and the main street of Richmond's West End.

SR 6 is a Virginia Byway from SR 151 at Avon to SR 650 near Manakin.

Route description

The state highway heads south as Afton Mountain Road, which descends the mountain curvaceously and passes through the village of Afton, where the highway crosses over a CSX rail line. At the bottom of the descent, SR 6 meets SR 151 (Critzers Shop Road) in the village of Avon. The two highways head south as Rockfish Valley Highway through the namesake valley. Just south of Greenfield, SR 6 leaves SR 151 and heads east as River Road, which follows the Rockfish River through a mountainous area south to US 29 (Thomas Nelson Highway). SR 6 heads east along the four-lane divided highway between several mountains before splitting to the southeast as Irish Road. The state highway crosses over Norfolk Southern Railway's Washington District in Faber and enters Albemarle County at a gap between Shiloh Mountain and Butler Mountain.

SR 6 continues east along a mountainous area where the highway passes through the communities of Damon, Tillmans, Esmont, and Porters.  The state highway enters an area of more gentle terrain on its way to Scottsville, which is on the border between Albemarle and Fluvanna counties.  At the north end of the town, SR 6 joins SR 20 in a concurrency on Valley Street.  In the center of town, SR 6 heads east as Main Street while SR 20 crosses the James River.  The state highway parallels the river and CSX's Rivanna Subdivision through the town before turning north and ascending out of the river valley.  SR 6 continues east as River Road through Kidds Store and Cohasset to Fork Union, home of Fork Union Military Academy.  The state highway runs concurrently with US 15 (James Madison Highway) northeast from Fork Union before diverging at Dixie.

SR 6 passes through Holmhead and crosses the Rivanna River shortly before passing through the town of Columbia, where the highway is named St. James Street.  At the east end of the town, SR 6 enters Goochland County and briefly parallels the Rivanna Subdivision through the valley of the James River.  The state highway veers away from the river and meets the northern end of SR 45 (Cartersville Road) at Georges Tavern.  SR 6 approaches the river again just before arriving in Goochland.  At the north end of the county seat, the state highway joins US 522 (Sandy Hook Road) in a concurrency and heads south past the Western Campus of J. Sargeant Reynolds Community College.  SR 6 and US 522 pass the county offices and the Virginia Correctional Center for Women before US 522 heads south across the James River as Maidens Road.  SR 6 heads through the villages of Manakin and Sabot, between which SR 6 expands to a four-lane divided highway.  At Richmond Country Club, River Road splits to the south and the state highway continues east as Patterson Avenue.

SR 6 meets the SR 288 freeway at a cloverleaf interchange before crossing Tuckahoe Creek into suburban Henrico County.  The state highway intersects Gaskins Road, which heads north as SR 157, and Parham Road in the suburb of Tuckahoe.   At Glenside Drive, which leads north to Monument Avenue, SR 6 veers southeast and enters the city of Richmond.  The state highway becomes an undivided highway just before intersecting SR 197 (Malvern Avenue).  SR 6 crosses over Interstate 195 (Beltline Expressway), which is accessed via Thompson Street, which the state highway intersects as it shifts to two-lane Kensington Avenue.  The state highway continues through the Museum District until it reaches its eastern terminus at SR 161 (Boulevard) one block north of the Virginia Museum of Fine Arts.

Major intersections

References

External links

Virginia Highways Project: VA 6

006
State Route 006
State Route 006
State Route 006
State Route 006
State Route 006
State Route 006
006